Kakisa Lake is a large lake located in the Northwest Territories, Canada. It is fed by the Kakisa River, and near to the community of Kakisa. An outcropping of the Kakisa Formation occurs along the side of this lake.

See also

List of lakes in the Northwest Territories

References

Lakes of the Northwest Territories